The Caller may refer to:

The Caller (folk song), a 19th-century song written by Edward “Ned” Corvan
The Caller (1987 film), a 1987 mystery-thriller film: mysterious man joins a woman in her forest cabin. The two examine each other's stories for inconsistencies.
The Caller (2008 film), a 2008 drama-thriller film: executive of energy company exposes their corruption and becomes target for assassination
The Caller (2011 film), a 2011 supernatural thriller film: woman in new apartment receives strange calls on antique phone
The Caller (novel), a crime fiction novel by Karin Fossum
The Caller, a 2013 fantasy novel for young adults by Juliet Marillier
 The Caller, print publication for Crime Stoppers International
 The Daily Caller, an American news and opinion website based in Washington, D.C.

See also
 Caller (disambiguation)